The 2000–01 season was Manchester United's ninth season in the Premier League, and their 26th consecutive season in the top division of English football. United won the Premier League for the third successive season and the seventh time since its inauguration in 1993. They were less successful in cup competitions, going out in the fourth round of the FA Cup, the fourth round of the League Cup and the quarter-finals of the Champions League.

New goalkeeper Fabien Barthez was an instant success, and previous first-choice goalkeeper Mark Bosnich failed to feature in the first team in 2000–01, opting to join Chelsea on a free transfer in January, despite equally limited first-team opportunities at Stamford Bridge. Veteran striker Teddy Sheringham had an excellent season, topping the club's goalscoring charts and gaining both the PFA and FWA Player of the Year awards. However, the arrival of Dutch striker Ruud van Nistelrooy from PSV Eindhoven at the end of the season prompted Sheringham to return to Tottenham Hotspur on a free transfer. Also leaving the club was Henning Berg, who was loaned to his old club Blackburn Rovers just after the start of the season, and moved on a permanent contract in December, joining former United players John Curtis and Mark Hughes in Blackburn's successful campaign that saw them promoted back to the Premier League after a two-year exile.

Pre-season and friendlies

FA Charity Shield

Premier League

FA Cup

League Cup

UEFA Champions League

Group stage

Second group stage

Knockout phase

Squad statistics

Transfers
On the way out of United, during the summer were defender Danny Higginbotham, goalkeeper Massimo Taibi, midfielder Jordi Cruyff, and forward Alex Notman. Higginbotham left United for Derby County, after three years to fulfil his desire to play more first team football, Taibi signed for Reggina, after he had been on loan at the club during the second half of the 1999–2000 season, Cruyff signed for Alavés, after his United contract had expired, and Notman, who had never played a Premier League match for United, signed for Norwich City, where he would remain for three years.

No players arrived at United throughout the whole 2000–01 season.

Leaving United during the winter were Norwegian defender Henning Berg, who signed for Blackburn Rovers for a fee of £1.75 million, Northern Irish forward David Healy, who signed for Preston North End for a fee of £1.5 million, and Australian goalkeeper Mark Bosnich, who signed for Chelsea on a free transfer, after United had signed Fabien Barthez in the 2000 close season. Forward Teddy Sheringham left United to rejoin Tottenham Hotspur on 26 May.

Out

Loan in

References

2000-01
Manchester United
2001